Governor Lowe may refer to:

Enoch Louis Lowe (1820–1892), 29th Governor of Maryland
Hudson Lowe (1769–1844), Governor of St Helena from 1815 to 1821
Ralph P. Lowe (1805–1883), 4th Governor of Iowa
Richard Barrett Lowe (1902–1972), 3rd Governor of Guam and 42nd Governor of American Samoa

See also
Frederick Low (1828–1894), 9th Governor of California